ŽOK Luka Bar is a Montenegrin women's volleyball club founded in 1992. Based in seaside town of Bar, named after Port of Bar (Montenegrin: Luka Bar), it's the most successful Montenegrin women's volleyball club, with the most titles in domestic competitions.

History
Founded as a part of Port of Bar, ŽOK Luka Bar soon became most successful Montenegrin club, and the only club from Montenegro which played in FR Yugoslavia / Serbia and Montenegro First League. Since the middle of nineties, Luka Bar is continuously playing in the elite-round of women's volleyball, often with participation in European Cups.
From 1994 to 2006, biggest success of Luka Bar in domestic competitions was placement to the Yugoslav Cup finals on seasons 1997-98 and 2002-03.
After the Montenegrin independence, Luka Bar became first winner of Montenegrin women's volley league and Montenegrin women's volleyball Cup. 
For the first time in club's history, Luka Bar participated in CEV Women's Champions League during the season 2016-17, but eliminated in first leg against Estonian team Kohila VC (2-3; 1-3). Luka Bar continued international season 2016-17 in Women's CEV Cup - eliminating VC Tirol Innsbruck (3-1; 1-3) in first leg, but then defeated against Budowlani Łódź (0-3; 0-3).
Until today, Luka Bar won  numerous trophies in domestic competitions and became the greatest women's volleyball club in Montenegro, and among most successful at the territory of former Yugoslavia.

Honours and achievements
National Championship:
winners (10): 2006–07, 2007–08, 2008–09, 2012–13, 2013–14, 2014–15, 2015–16, 2016–17, 2017–18, 2018–19
runners-up (3): 2009–10, 2010–11, 2011–12
National Cup:
winners (7): 2006–07, 2010–11, 2011–12, 2012–13, 2013–14, 2014–15, 2016–17
runners-up (5): 2007-08, 2008–09, 2009–10, 2017–18, 2018–19
FR Yugoslavia Cup:
runners-up (2): 1997-98, 2002–03

European competitions

Team squad
Season 2016–2017, as of January 2017.

See also
 Montenegrin women's volley league
 Montenegrin women's volleyball Cup
 Volleyball Federation of Montenegro (OSCG)

References

External links
 ŽOK Luka Bar official page
 Volleyball Federation of Montenegro

Montenegrin volleyball clubs
Sport in Bar, Montenegro